Thunder Bay Press is a California-based publisher of illustrated non-fiction books. Subject matter includes adult crafts and leisure activities, pop culture, cooking, pets and domestic animals, sports, history, transportation, and nature.

Thunder Bay was founded by the book distributor Advanced Marketing Services in 1990. Advanced Marketing Services was acquired by Baker & Taylor in 2007.

It is owned by the book distribution firm, Readerlink Distribution Services, who acquired Thunder Bay from Baker & Taylor in 2015. The imprint's distribution is handled by Publishers Group West.

Then and Now series
It is also one of the two United States publisher of books in the Then and Now series of books  that include:

 Baltimore Then and Now 
 New York Then and Now

References

External links
 Thunder Bay Press Official site

Publishing companies established in 1990
Companies based in San Diego
Book publishing companies based in California